Pamban Island ( pāmpaṉ tīvu), also known as Rameswaram Island, is an island located between peninsular India and Sri Lanka, on the Rama Setu archipelago. The second largest island in the latter, Pamban Island belongs to India and forms the Rameswaram taluk of the Ramanathapuram district of the state of Tamil Nadu. It is the largest island in Tamil Nadu by area. The principal town in the island is the pilgrimage centre of Rameswaram.

Location and size 

Pamban Island is situated between 9°11' N and  9°19' N latitude and  79°12' E  to 79°23' E longitudes. The chain formed by Pamban Island, the shoals of Adam's Bridge, and Mannar Island of Sri Lanka separate Palk Bay and the Palk Strait in the northeast from the Gulf of Mannar in the southwest. Pamban Island extends for around 30 km in width from the township of Pamban in the west to the remains of Dhanushkodi towards the south-east. The length of the island varies from 2 km at the Dhanushkodi promontory to 7 km near Rameswaram. The area of the island is around 67 km2.

Demographics 

Pamban Island constitutes a separate taluk of Ramanathapuram district with four administrative divisions,  Okarisalkulam, Mahindi, Pamban and Rameswaram. There are two administrative villages, Pamban and Rameswaram. The two main towns on Pamban Island are Pamban and Rameswaram. There are also smaller settlements upon the island like Thangachimadam. The taluk headquarters is at Rameswaram. There are railway stations at Pamban and Rameswaram.

Rameswaram with a population of 44,856 (2011 census) is the largest and most populous town on the island. It is one of the most sacred Hindu religious sites and a pilgrimage destination for thousands of Hindus every year. The Ramanathaswamy Temple at Rameswaram has the longest corridor in Asia. Rameswaram is situated at the centre of the island, around 11 kilometres from the township of Pamban and 18 kilometres from Dhanushkodi.

Pamban, situated at the western edge of Pamban Island, is a fishing village and a harbour which is the main point of entry for the pilgrimage centre of Rameswaram. It has a population of around 9,000 inhabitants. Its importance has enhanced because it is located at the eastern end of Pamban Bridge through which supplies enter the island. Pamban is 11 kilometres from Rameswaram, 30 kilometres from the tip of Dhanushkodi and around 7 kilometres from Mandapam on the Indian mainland. It is separated from the Indian mainland by a narrow strip of sea.

Thangachimadam situated between Pamban and Rameswaram is a minor settlement. It derives its name from a mutt(Madam) which is located in the town. There are a couple of temples and a few churches. The township is also served by a police station. Ekantharamar Temple constructed and maintained by the Kanchi mutt is the main attraction here.

At the eastern tip of the island lies the site of Dhanushkodi, a harbour and a pilgrimage centre, was washed away by the December 1964 cyclone. Prior to its destruction it was a flourishing township and a prominent place of pilgrimage. In its heyday, it rivalled Rameswaram in size and population. However, the December 1964 cyclone destroyed the town in its entirety claiming over 2,000 lives and crippling power supply and communications. Houses, temples, churches, dispensaries and dharmashalas were destroyed leaving nothing but a ghost town. Some of the dharmashalas and a prominent mutt based in Dhanushkodi have been moved to Rameswaram. But Dhanushkodi could never be rebuilt. Dhanushkodi was well connected by rail and road with Pamban and the mainland until the cyclone struck. The ruins of the station and the railway track  have been left untouched thereby making the ghost-town a popular tourist destination.

Physical features and vegetation 

Pamban Island has a few hillocks and elevated physical features in the vicinity of Rameswaram of which Mt. Gandamadana is the tallest. It is believed that this was the hillock from whose summit Lord Rama observed Sri Lanka and conceived the idea of constructing a bridge between India and Sri Lanka. A temple commemorates the site.

Most of Pamban Island is covered with white sand and hence is not suitable for cultivation. Coconut and palm trees are found in abundance along with fig and eucalyptus plants. Scrubs and rushes are found in abundance all along the sea-shore.

Notes

External links 
 "Discover the less explored Pamban Island"
 Imperial Gazetteer of India, v. 19, p. 375

Islands of Tamil Nadu
Ramanathapuram district
Islands of the Indian Ocean
Islands of India
Populated places in India
Islands of the Bay of Bengal